Woman Hater, Woman Haters or woman hater may also refer to:

 Woman hater, a person who practices misogyny, the hatred or contempt for women
 The Woman Hater, a 1606 Jacobean era stage play by Francis Beaumont and John Fletcher
 The Woman Hater (1910 Powers film), a 1910 film starring Pearl White by the Powers Company
 The Woman Hater (1910 Thanhouser film), a 1910 film featuring Violet Heming by the Thanhouser Company
 The Woman Hater (1925 film), a 1925 American silent drama film
 The Woman Haters, a 1913 short comedy film featuring Fatty Arbuckle
 Woman Haters, a 1934 short film starring the Three Stooges
 Woman Hater (1948 film), a British romantic comedy
 The Woman Hater, a satiric comedy play by Frances Burney
 Sone ha-Nashim (The Woman-Hater), a humorous satire written by Judah ibn Shabbethai